Westminster Public Schools is a public school district located in extreme southwestern Adams County, Colorado, United States.  The district serves the southeastern portion of the City of Westminster and adjacent areas. Originally known as Adams County School District No. 50, the name was changed in February 2016.

Board of education
President: Ken Ciancio
Vice President: Max Math
Secretary: Christine Martinez
Treasurer: Aaron Martin
Director: Dan Orecchio

Schools

Early childhood
Early Learning Center at F.M. Day (Infant - Preschool)
Early Learning Center at Gregory Hill (Preschool)

Neighborhood schools
Colorado Sports Leadership Academy
Fairview Elementary School
Harris Park Elementary School
Josephine Hodgkins Leadership Academy
Mesa Elementary School
Orchard Park Academy
Sherrelwood Elementary School
Sunset Ridge Elementary School
Tennyson Knolls Preparatory School

Online
Westminster Virtual Academy

Innovation schools
Colorado STEM Academy
John E. Flynn A Marzano Academy
Metropolitan Arts Academy
Westminster Academy for International Studies

Middle schools
Shaw Heights Middle School
Iver C. Ranum Middle School, Westminster, Colorado (transition to a middle school in 2010; 2021-22 was the last school year as a traditional middle school)
On April 26, 2022, the WPS Board of Education authorized spending on an extensive renovation project at Ranum Middle School which will transform the historic building into a state-of-the-art multi-purpose campus offering expanded Career Technical Education (CTE) programs for students.

High schools
Hidden High School (alternate high school)
Westminster High School
Iver C. Ranum High School, Westminster, Colorado (opened in 1961 and closed in 2010; students were transferred to Westminster High School)

References

External links

School districts in Colorado
Westminster, Colorado
School districts established in 1946
Education in Adams County, Colorado
1946 establishments in Colorado